The zatula, also known as the rubal, rubel, kuchelka, kachanka, kachalka, and the rebra, is a Ukrainian folk musical instrument. It is primarily a household item used for washing and drying clothes, but it is occasionally used as a percussion instrument.

The zatula consists of a piece of wood with grooves carved into it. A wooden rod is run over these grooves to soften clothes after washing. The zatula is played in a humorous way by placing the rounded rod under the chin and using the zatula as a bow, playing over the rod, or vice versa. The rasping sound thus produced is similar to that of the derkach.

See also
Ukrainian folk music
Washboard

Sources

Humeniuk, A. Ukrainski narodni muzychni instrumenty, Kyiv: Naukova dumka, 1967 
Mizynec, V. Ukrainian Folk Instruments, Melbourne: Bayda books, 1984 
Cherkaskyi, L. Ukrainski narodni muzychni instrumenty, Tekhnika, Kyiv, Ukraine, 2003 - 262 pages.  

Ukrainian musical instruments
Idiophones
Hand percussion
Percussion instruments played with specialised beaters
European percussion instruments
Unpitched percussion instruments